Cyrene or Kyrene, was an ancient Greek and later Roman city near present-day Shahhat, Libya. It was the oldest and most important of the five Greek cities, known as the pentapolis, in the region. It gave eastern Libya the classical name Cyrenaica that it has retained to modern times. Located nearby is the ancient Necropolis of Cyrene. The traditional founder of the city was Battus the Lacedemonian, though the exact relationship between the fledgling city and other cities has led historians to question that narrative. Particularly, the idea that Thera was the sole "mother city" is disputed; and the relationship with other cities, such as Sparta and Samian merchants, is unclear.

Cyrene lies in a lush valley in the Jebel Akhdar uplands. The city was named after a spring, Kyre, which the Greeks consecrated to Apollo. It became the seat of the Cyrenaics, a famous school of philosophy in the fourth century BC, founded by Aristippus, a disciple of Socrates.

History

The founding of Cyrene according to Herodotus 
Grinus, son of Aesanius a descendant of Theras, and king of the island of Thera, had visited the oracle of Delphi, which advised him  to found a new city in Libya.

Many years passed without the advice being taken. Thera succumbed to a horrific drought, and all of the crops and trees had perished. The Therans again sent to Delphi and were reminded that the oracle had said several years before to settle in the country of Libya, but this time she specifically said to found a settlement in the land of Cyrenaica.

Not knowing how to get to Libya, they sent a messenger to Crete to find someone to lead them on their journey. They found a dealer in purple dye named Corobius. He had once traveled to an island near Libya called Platea [or Plataea, modern Jazirat Barda`ah]. Grinus and Corobius sailed to Platea and left Corobius there with months of supplies. Grinus returned to Thera to collect men to settle the new colony. Following two years of little success, they returned to Delphi, where the oracle repeated her advice to move directly to Libya rather than the island. So they moved to a place called Aziris. They settled there for six years, and were very successful. Then they were persuaded by Libyans to move further inland, to the location that is now Cyrene. Battus, the king of that time, reigned for 40 years, until he died, and his son, Arcesilaus, reigned for 16 years. The Oracle told the third king, another Battus, to bring Greek citizens to the settlement, and that expansion occupied much surrounding land previously owned by the Libyans.

Greek period

According to Greek tradition, Cyrene was founded in 631 BC as a settlement of Greeks from the island of Thera, traditionally led by Battus I, at a site  from its associated port, Apollonia (Marsa Sousa). Traditional details concerning the founding of the city are contained in Herodotus' Histories IV. Cyrene promptly became the chief town of Libya and established commercial relations with all the Greek cities, reaching the height of its prosperity under its own kings in the 5th century BC. Soon after 460 BC it became a republic.  In 413 BC, during the Peloponnesian War, Cyrene supplied Spartan forces with two triremes and pilots. After the death of Alexander the Great (323 BC), the Cyrenian republic became subject to the Ptolemaic dynasty.

Ophellas, the general who occupied the city in the name of Ptolemy I Soter, ruled the city almost independently until his death, when Ptolemy's son-in-law Magas became its governor. In 276 BC Magas crowned himself king and declared de facto independence, marrying the daughter of the Seleucid emperor and forming an alliance with him in order to invade the Ptolemaic Kingdom.

The invasion was unsuccessful, and in 250 BC, after Magas' death, Cyrenaica became part of the Ptolemaic empire controlled from Alexandria. It became Roman territory in 96 BC when Ptolemy Apion bequeathed Cyrenaica to Rome. In 74 BC the territory was formally transformed into a Roman province.

Roman period

In 74 BC Cyrene was created a Roman province; but, whereas under the Ptolemies the Jewish inhabitants had enjoyed equal rights, they were allegedly increasingly oppressed by the now autonomous and much larger Greek population. Tensions came to a head in the insurrection of the Jews of Cyrene under Vespasian (73 AD, the First Jewish–Roman War). This supposedly included many "Sicari" (lit. dagger men). This precipitated further Jewish insurrection under Trajan (117 AD, the Kitos War). This revolt was quelled by Marcius Turbo, but not before huge numbers of civilians had been brutally massacred by the Jewish rebels. According to Eusebius of Caesarea, the Jewish rebellion left Libya depopulated to such an extent that a few years later new colonies had to be established there by the emperor Hadrian to maintain the viability of continued settlement.

Plutarch in his work De mulierum virtutibus ("On the Virtues of Women") describes how the tyrant of Cyrene, Nicocrates, was deposed by his wife Aretaphila of Cyrene around the year 50 BC

The famous "Venus of Cyrene", a headless marble statue representing the goddess Venus, a Roman copy of a Greek original, was discovered by Italian soldiers here in 1913. It was transported to Rome, where it remained until 2008, when it was returned to Libya. A large number of Roman sculptures and inscriptions were excavated at Cyrene by Captain Robert Murdoch Smith and Commander Edwin A. Porcher during the mid nineteenth century and can now be seen in the British Museum. They include the Apollo of Cyrene and a unique bronze head of an African man.

Biblical references

Cyrene is referred to in the deuterocanonical book 2 Maccabees. The book of 2 Maccabees itself is said by its author to be an abridgment of a five-volume work by a Hellenized Jew by the name of Jason of Cyrene who lived around 100 BC.

Cyrene is also mentioned in the New Testament. A Cyrenian named Simon carried the cross of Christ (Mark 15:21 and parallels). In Acts, 2:10 describes Jews from Cyrene hearing the disciples speaking in their own language in Jerusalem on the day of Pentecost; 6:9 mentions some Cyrenian Jews who disputed with a disciple named Stephen; 11:20 tells of Jewish Christians originally from Cyrene who (along with believers from Cyprus) first preached the Gospel to non-Jews; 13:1 names Lucius of Cyrene as one of several to whom the Holy Spirit spoke, instructing them to appoint Barnabas and Saul (later Paul) for missionary service.

Later Christianity
According to the tradition of the Coptic Orthodox Church, its founder, Saint Mark was a native of Cyrene and ordained the first bishop of Cyrene. The Roman Martyrology<ref>Martyrologium Romanum (Typographia Vaticana 2001 )</ref> mentions under 4 July a tradition that in the persecution of Diocletian a bishop Theodorus of Cyrene was scourged and had his tongue cut out. Earlier editions of the Martyrology mentioned what may be the same person also under 26 March. Letter 67 of Synesius tells of an irregular episcopal ordination carried out by a bishop Philo of Cyrene, which was condoned by Athanasius. The same letter mentions that a nephew of this Philo, who bore the same name, also became bishop of Cyrene. Although Cyrene was by then ruined, a bishop of Cyrene name Rufus attended the Robber Council of Ephesus in 449. And there was still a bishop of Cyrene, named Leontius, at the time of Greek Patriarch Eulogius of Alexandria (580–607).Raymond Janin, v. Cyrène in Dictionnaire d'Histoire et de Géographie ecclésiastiques, vol. XIII, Paris 1956, coll. 1162–1164

Known bishops of the town includeMichel Le Quien, Oriens christianus in quatuor Patriarchatus digestus , (Parigi, 1740), volII, coll. 621–624.Raymond Janin, v. Cyrène in Dictionnaire d'Histoire et de Géographie ecclésiastiques, vol. XIII, (Paris, 1956), coll. 1162–1164.
Saint Luke by tradition
Theodoro (fl.302)
Filo I (fl.370 circa)
Filo II (fl.370 circa)
Rufo (fl.449)
Leontius (fl.600 circa)

No longer a residential bishopric, Cyrene is today listed by the Catholic Church as a titular see.Entry , at www.gcatholic.org The Greek Orthodox Church has also treated it as a titular see.

Decline

Cyrene's chief local export through much of its early history was the medicinal herb silphium, used as an abortifacient; the herb was pictured on most Cyrenian coins. Silphium was in such demand that it was harvested to extinction. This, in conjunction with commercial competition from Carthage and Alexandria, resulted in a reduction in the city's trade. Cyrene, with its port of Apollonia (Marsa Susa), remained an important urban center until the earthquake of 262, which damaged the Sanctuary of Demeter and Persephone in Cyrene. After the disaster, the emperor Claudius Gothicus restored Cyrene, naming it Claudiopolis'', but the restorations were poor and precarious. Natural catastrophes and a profound economic decline dictated its death, and in 365 another particularly devastating earthquake destroyed its already meager hopes of recovery. Ammianus Marcellinus described it in the 4th century as a deserted city, and Synesius, a native of Cyrene, described it in the following century as a vast ruin at the mercy of the nomads. Ultimately, the city fell under Arab conquest in 643, by which time little was left of the opulent Roman cities of Northern Africa.

Philosophy
Cyrene contributed to the intellectual life of the Greeks, through renowned philosophers and mathematicians. The School of Cyrene, known as the Cyrenaics, developed here as a minor Socratic school founded by Aristippus (perhaps the friend of Socrates, though according to some accounts a grandson of Aristippus with the same name). French Neo-Epicurean philosopher Michel Onfray has called Cyrene "a philosophical Atlantis" thanks to its huge importance in the birth and initial development of the ethics of pleasure.

Cyrene was the birthplace of Eratosthenes, who later went to Alexandria. Statues of philosophers, poets, and The Nine Muses, and a bust of Demosthenes were found in Cyrene.

Others included Aristippus successor and daughter Arete, Callimachus, Carneades, Ptolemais of Cyrene, and Synesius, a bishop of Ptolemais in the 4th century AD.

Present

Cyrene is now an archeological site near the village of Shahhat east of Bayda. One of its more significant features is the temple of Apollo, which was originally constructed as early as 7th century BC. Other ancient structures include a temple to Demeter and a partially unexcavated temple to Zeus. There is a large necropolis approximately 10 km between Cyrene and its ancient port of Apollonia. The Temple of Zeus, originally built in the 6th century BC, has been destroyed and rebuilt many times, being rebuilt in the 2nd century AD after the Jewish revolt in 115 AD and damaged during earthquakes in the 4th century AD. Since 1982, it has been a UNESCO World Heritage Site.

In 2005, Italian archaeologists from the University of Urbino discovered 76 intact Roman statues at Cyrene from the 2nd century AD. The statues remained undiscovered for so long because "during the earthquake of 375 AD, a supporting wall of the temple fell on its side, burying all the statues. They remained hidden under stone, rubble and earth for 1,630 years. The other walls sheltered the statues, so we were able to recover all the pieces, even works that had been broken."

Beginning in 2006, the Global Heritage Fund, in partnership with the Second University of Naples (SUN, Italy), the Libyan Department of Antiquities, and the Libyan Ministry of Culture, has worked to preserve the ancient site through a combination of holistic conservation practices and training of local skilled and unskilled labor. Apart from conducting ongoing emergency conservation on a theater inside the Sanctuary of Apollo through the process of anastylosis, the GHF-led team is developing a comprehensive master site management plan.

In 2007 Muammar Gaddafi's son planned safeguarding Libya's archaeological sites and preventing over-development of Mediterranean coastlines.

In May 2011, a number of objects excavated from Cyrene in 1917 and held in the vault of the National Commercial Bank in Benghazi were stolen. Looters tunnelled into the vault and broke into two safes that held the artefacts, which were part of the so-called "Benghazi Treasure". The whereabouts of these objects are currently unknown.

In 2017 UNESCO added Cyrene to its List of World Heritage in Danger.

Notable residents
 Eratosthenes (276 – 194 BC), mathematician, geographer, astronomer; librarian at the Library of Alexandria. First to calculate the circumference of the Earth.
 Simon of Cyrene, the man who helped carry the cross of Christ
 Aretaphila of Cyrene, noblewoman
 Arete of Cyrene, philosopher
 Aristippus (c. 435 – c. 356 BC), philosopher and founder of the Cyrenaic School.
 Carneades, Hellenistic Academic Skeptic Philosopher
 Magas of Cyrene (c. before 317 BC – 250 BC), King of Cyrenaica
 Callimachus (310/305 – 240 BC), poet, critic, and scholar at the Library of Alexandria
 Idaeus of Cyrene, an ancient Olympic winner at foot-race. He won at 275 B.C.
 Eugammon (fl. 6th century BC), epic poet
 Lacydes (3rd century BC), philosopher
 Theodorus (c. 5th century BC), mathematician
 Theaetetus of Cyrene, poet
 Philostephanus, Hellenistic writer 
 Callicratidas of Cyrene, a general
 Cratisthenes of Cyrene, an Olympic winner at chariot-race. There was a statue of him at Olympia, Greece, created by Pythagoras

Gallery

See also
 Cyrenaica
 Cyrenaics
 List of Kings of Cyrene
 Extramural Sanctuary of Demeter and Persephone at Cyrene, Libya

References

External links

Cyrene project summary at Global Heritage Fund
Explore Cyrene with Google Earth on Global Heritage Network
Cyrene and the Cyrenaica by Jona Lendering
University of Pennsylvania Museum excavations at Cyrene

Ancient Greek archaeological sites in Libya
Jabal al Akhdar
Populated places established in the 7th century BC
Dorian colonies
Ancient Thera
Jebel Akhdar (Libya)
World Heritage Sites in Libya
Archaeological sites in Libya
Greek colonies in Libya
Tourism in Libya
Ancient Cyrenaica
Former populated places in Libya
Roman amphitheaters in North Africa
Crete and Cyrenaica
Baladiyat of Libya